Dorothy Revier (born Doris Valerga; April 18, 1904 – November 19, 1993) was an American actress.

Early years
Born as Doris Valerga in San Francisco on April 18, 1904, Revier was one of five siblings of the famous Valerga performing family of the Bay Area. Her mother was English and her father was Italian. She was educated in the public schools of Oakland before going to New York City to study classical dancing.

Career

Revier danced with a Russian ballet company on tour, but homesickness brought her back to San Francisco, where she became the featured dancer at Tait's Cafe. She was discovered by a talent agent while working in a cabaret and signed to a film contract by Harry Cohn.

She made her film debut in Life's Greatest Question (1921) and was active throughout the 1920s, playing in The Virgin (1924), The Supreme Test (1923), An Enemy of Men (1925), The Far Cry (1926), Cleopatra (1928), Tanned Legs (1929) and The Iron Mask (1929).  

After recovering from two broken arms suffered in a 1930 car accident, she played roles in low-budget films for Columbia Pictures.  In 1935 she played the role of a saloon girl in Paramount Pictures' second Hopalong Cassidy film, The Eagle's Brood, working alongside William Boyd. In many films she appeared as a vamp, and she later worked as a free-lance performer in Buck Jones westerns such as Lovable Liar (1933). The Cowboy and the Kid (1936) was her final film.

Personal life
Revier was married to director Harry J. Revier, and to commercial artist William Pelayo. Both marriages ended in divorce.

A resident of West Hollywood, Revier died at the age of 89, at the Queen of Angels-Hollywood Presbyterian Medical Center, and was interred at Forest Lawn - Hollywood Hills Cemetery in Los Angeles area, buried under the simple marker of name and dates, marked with the lone inscription, "Beloved Actress."

Partial filmography

 The Broadway Madonna (1922)
 The Wild Party (1923)
 The Sword of Valor (1924)
 Marry in Haste (1924)
 The Virgin (1924)
 The Cowboy and the Flapper (1924)
 The Martyr Sex (1924)
 The Other Kind of Love (1924)
 The Rose of Paris (1924)
 Do It Now (1924)
 An Enemy Of Men (1925)
 Sealed Lips (1925)
 The Fate of a Flirt (1925)
 Just a Woman (1925)
 Steppin' Out (1925)
 The Far Cry (1926) - Yvonne Beaudet
 The Better Way (1926)
 Poker Faces (1926)
 When the Wife's Away (1926)
 The False Alarm (1926)
 Poor Girls (1927)
 The Price of Honor (1927)
 Wandering Girls (1927)
 Stolen Pleasures (1927)
 The Clown (1927)
 The Red Dance (1928)
 Submarine (1928)
 Sinner's Parade (1928)
 Father and Son (1929)
 The Iron Mask (1929)
 The Quitter (1929)
 The Donovan Affair (1929)
 The Dance of Life (1929)
 The Mighty (1929)
 The Way of All Men (1930)
The Squealer  (1930)
 Call of the West (1930)
 Vengeance (1930)
 The Black Camel (1931)
 Anybody's Blonde (1931)
 Left Over Ladies (1931)
 Night World (1932)
 Beauty Parlor (1932)
 The King Murder (1932)
 The Arm of the Law (1932)
 No Living Witness (1932)
 The Secrets of Wu Sin (1932)
 Green Eyes (1934)
 Unknown Blonde (1934)
 Circumstantial Evidence (1935)
 The Lady in Scarlet (1935)
 The Eagle's Brood (1935)
 $20 a Week (1935)

References

Fresno, California Bee Republican, "Louella Parsons Column", February 1, 1933, Page 4.
Oakland, California Tribune, "Mother Wife In Oakland Maid's Bigamy Tangle", February 23, 1923, Page 15.
Oakland Tribune, "Oakland Girl Screen Star", Sunday, June 10, 1923, Page 12-A.
Oakland Tribune, "In New Hall of Fame", Thursday evening, November 10, 1935, Page B25.

External links

 

American people of Italian descent
American people of English descent
American film actresses
American silent film actresses
Western (genre) film actresses
Actresses from Oakland, California
1904 births
1993 deaths
Burials at Forest Lawn Memorial Park (Hollywood Hills)
20th-century American actresses
American expatriates in France
WAMPAS Baby Stars